Lavenia as a given name may refer to:

 Lavenia Cavuru (born 1994), Fijian rugby sevens player
 Lavenia Padarath (1944/1945–2019), Fijian politician
 Lavenia Tinai (born 1990), Fijian rugby union player

Fijian-language feminine given names